Feiz is a given name and surname. Notable people with the name include:

Surname
Afshin Feiz, British photographer
Khodi Feiz (born 1963), Iranian industrial designer

Given name
Feiz Mohammad (born 1970), Australian preacher